The Game of Life, also known as Life, is an 1860 board game by Milton Bradley.

Game of Life also often refers to:
Conway's Game of Life, in mathematics, a cellular automaton

Game of Life or The Game of Life may also refer to:

Games
 Jinsei Game, the 1967 Japanese version of the board game
 The Game of Life (game show), a 2011 television game show based on the board game
 The Game of Life Card Game, a 2002 card game based on the board game
 The Game of Life/Yahtzee/Payday, a 2005 video game based on the board game
 The Game of Life: Twists & Turns, a 2007 board game variant of the original game

Other
 Da Game of Life, a 2001 rap music album by Totally Insane
 Da Game of Life (film), a 1998 direct-to-video short film starring Snoop Dogg
 Game of Life (film) (2007, 2011), a film originally titled Oranges
 The Game of Life (TV programme), a 1986 ABC programme
 "The Game of Life", a song by Scorpions from their album Humanity: Hour I
 The Game of Life (1922 film), a 1922 film by G. B. Samuelson
 The Game of Life (album), a 2007 music album by Arsonists Get All the Girls
 The Game of Life (book), a 1925 book by Florence Scovel Shinn

See also
 Evolution: The Game of Intelligent Life
 Life simulation game